Racine is an unincorporated community in Newton County, Missouri, United States.  It is part of the Joplin, Missouri Metropolitan Statistical Area.

History
A post office called Racine has been in operation since 1869. The town was originally called Dayton, after Dayton, Ohio, as was the surrounding township. However, there was already a Dayton, Missouri, causing confusion for Postal Service deliveries. The name was changed in 1871 to Racine, after Racine, Wisconsin. The name of Dayton Township remained the same.

Geography

Racine is located along the Frisco Railroad tracks between Neosho and Seneca in Lost Creek Valley.  Racine is on Route 86 where Route K and Route CC intersect. It is positioned geographically among three other towns: it is 6 miles west of Neosho, 10 miles south of Joplin, and 5½ miles northeast of Seneca.

Education
Racine is encompassed entirely by the Seneca School District; it schools all students enrolled in public education in the community.

Buildings
There are two churches in town, an Apostolic Church and a large Christian church. A small fire station is located here that is part of the Seneca Area Fire Protection District.

References

Unincorporated communities in Newton County, Missouri
Joplin, Missouri, metropolitan area
Unincorporated communities in Missouri